Keep the Dogs Away is the first studio album by the heavy metal band Thor, released in 1977. The album went gold shortly after it was released, selling 50,000 copies in Canada. In 2009 it was reissued on CD for the first time in a special 30th Anniversary Edition; It included a 16-page booklet and a few unreleased bonus tracks. In 2016 it was reissued once again with even more bonus content under Deadline Music in a deluxe 6-panel digipak CD with alternate cover art, liner notes from a longtime fan, author/producer Brian Kehew, 22 rare and unreleased bonus cuts on a separate disc, and a vintage 1984 London concert, that previously was limited to VHS, now on DVD. The first CD is the original album and all bonus content is put on the second disk. A faithful reissue of the original vinyl that had meticulously recreated the original pressing with the original cover art, foldout poster, and printed inner sleeve.

Track listing

 Tracks 11-14: Songs cut from the original album
 Tracks 15-17: Previously unreleased tracks

Personnel
Band
Jon Mikl Thor – vocals
John Shand – guitars, six-string bass
David Munkhoff – guitars
Terry McKeown – bass
Billy King – drums

Guest/Session
Barry Keane	- percussion
The Tootonic Chorale - backing vocals

Miscellaneous staff
Ian Guenther - producer
Willi Morrison - producer
George C. I. Semkiw - engineering, mixing
Mick Walsh - engineering assistant
Mark Wright - engineering assistant
John Williamson - cover art, design
Joan Chisholm - cover art, design
Leslie Smart - design
Normands Berzins - photography

References

1977 debut albums
Thor (band) albums
RCA Records albums
Cleopatra Records albums